The Last Outpost may refer to:

 The Last Outpost (1935 film), a 1935 film with Cary Grant
 The Last Outpost (1951 film), a 1951 film starring Ronald Reagan
 "The Last Outpost" (Star Trek: The Next Generation), a first-season episode of Star Trek: The Next Generation
 Gundam W G-Unit: Last Outpost, the Tokyopop release of the manga side story Gundam Wing Dual Story: G-UNIT
 Last Outpost, a 2018 Discovery Channel reality television series centered around a metal fabrication / mechanical modification shop based in Anchorage, Alaska

See also
 Outpost (disambiguation)